"Minas com Bahia" is a song recorded by Brazilian singer Daniela Mercury for her forth studio album Feijão com Arroz. The song is featured with Samuel Rosa, the lead singer of the Brazilian pop rock band Skank.

Chart performance
The song reached the top twenty on the Billboard Hot 100 Brazil chart.

Daniela Mercury songs
1997 singles
1997 songs
Epic Records singles